Yerevan Ararat Brandy Factory, officially known as the Yerevan Ararat Brandy-Wine-Vodka Factory, commonly known with its famous brand Noy, is a leading Armenian brandy production company in Yerevan, Armenia, currently owned by Gagik Tsarukyan's Multi Group Concern. It was founded in 1877 during the rule of the Russian Empire. The factory is located on the left bank of Hrazdan river at the centre of Yerevan, occupying the area of the historic Erivan Fortress.

History
Nerses Tairyan was a well-known merchant and philanthropist. In 1877 he started industrial production of wine, and later brandy in 1887, at the territory of the former Erivan Fortress. Hovhannes Aivazovsky, who was a relative of Tairyan, helped him to build the factory.

In 1899 Nerses Tairyan leased the factory to Nikolay Shustov, who purchased it a year later for 50,000 roubles. Having established his own business in Moscow in 1863, Shustov became one of the first producers of brandy in Russia. Already in the 1870s "Shustov and Sons" company managed to take into its hands 80% of brandy-wine-vodka-liqueur production in the Russian Empire. In 1901 Nikolay Shustov  sent samples of brandy to an exhibition in Paris. The judges, venerable French tasters, unanimously granted Grand Prix to the unknown brandy-maker, but after they found out that he was not French and the brandy was sent from Armenia, they were so astonished, that made an exception for Nikolay Shustov and granted him the privilege to put the word "cognac" on his labels, instead of "brandy", as it should naturally be. Thus, Shustov became the first and only foreign wine-maker all throughout the history of brandy-producing, who was honoured with this privilege.

In 1899 Shustov invited Kyrill Silchenko, who had just finished Nikitin's school of wine-making, to work at the factory. He worked at the factory devotedly and dedicated all his life to the development of production of wine and brandy. This is why Armenians called him "the great Ukrainian son of Armenian people".

The current facilities of the Yerevan Ararat Brandy Factory were built in 1938 on the site of the former sardar palace of the Erivan Fortress. The building was designed by architect Rafael Israelyan.

In 2002, the factory entered Multi Group Concern.  Around US$ 50 million were invested into restoration and constructions, acquisition of new bottling line and oak barrels. A number of recipes and technologies were restored by crumbs. With the help of old papers, museum exhibits, family archives, specialists and technologists of the factory assembled and classified the whole invaluable experience, accumulated throughout the period of plant's functioning, and, consequently, the lost and forgotten glorious name of Armenian Brandy was restored.

The factory currently produces several types of Armenian famous brandies including "Noy" and "Araspel". "Noy" is a worldwide well known brandy especially in with its 25-year-old "Brandy Noy Tirakal".

The factory houses a museum that features the history of the factory as well as the notable figures who worked for to the development of the factory, including Tairyan, Shustov, Sedrakyan, Musinyants and Silchenko.

Production

The factory is mainly famous for its Noy and Kremlin Award Armenian brandy brands. The products are exported to many countries of the CIS and Europe, as well as the United States and Australia.

On April 21, 2016, the factory presented its new products of "Noy 30" and "Noy 50" year old Armenian brandy. The ceremony took place in the Multi Grand Hotel at the north of Yerevan, with the presence of president Serzh Sargsyan.

Currently, the Yerevan Ararat Brandy Factory produces a variety of Armenian brandy, mainly under the brand NOY: 
NOY 50 Years Old.
NOY 30 Years Old.
NOY Tirakal, 25 years old.
NOY Kremlin Award, 7, 10, 15 and 20 years old.
NOY Classic, 7, 10, 15 and 20 years old.
NOY Traditional, 3, 5, 7 and 10 years old.
NOY Gift, 3, 5, 7 and 10 years old.
NOY Araspel, 3 and 5 years old.
NOY Régal by Uberto Gucci, 3 and 5 years old.
NOY 140, collection.
NOY 135, collection.

Other brandy brands produced by the factory include:
Erivan Fortress, 3, 5 and 7 years old.
Legends of Sevan, 3, 5 and 7 years old.
Varpet, 3, 5 and 7 years old.

The factory has recently launched whisky production under 3 brands:
Magarant, 3 years old de luxe whisky.
Mac Ingal, 3 years old blended whisky.
Old Clark, 3 years old de luxe whisky.

See also
 Noy (brandy)
 Yerevan Brandy Company
 Yerevan Champagne Wines Factory

References

External links 
 
 

Wineries of Armenia
Armenian brands
Companies established in 1877
Distilleries in Armenia
Buildings and structures in Yerevan
Drink companies of the Soviet Union
Food and drink companies established in 1877
19th-century establishments in Armenia
1877 establishments in the Russian Empire
Wineries of the Soviet Union